Golanabad (also Romanized as Golanābād, Golnā Ābād, and Golnābād; also known as Golābād) is a village in Chahar Gonbad Rural District, in the Central District of Sirjan County, Kerman Province, Iran. At the 2006 census, its population was 98, in 23 families.

References 

Populated places in Sirjan County